Carlon is a given name and surname. Notable people referred to by this name include the following:

Given name
Carlon Blackman (born 1965), Barbadian sprinter
Carlon Brown (born 1989), American basketball player
Carlon Colker (born 1965), American celebrity doctor
Carlon Jeffery (born 1993), American actor and rapper

Surname
Fran Carlon (1913 – 1993), American actress
Ken Carlon (1923 – 2004), Australian rules footballer
Mark Carlon (born 1953), Australian rules footballer
Patricia Carlon (1927 – 2002), Australian writer
Tom Carlon (born 1987), English ice hockey player

See also

Cardon (surname)
Carlen (surname)
Carlin (name)
Carlo (name)
Carlone
Carloni
Carlos (given name)
Carlos (surname)
Carlson (name)
Carlton (name)
Carlyon (surname)
Caron (name)
Carson (given name)
Carson (surname)
Carton (surname)
Carbon (disambiguation)
Carlow (disambiguation)
Carron (disambiguation)
Caslon (disambiguation)